USS LST-474 was a United States Navy  used in the Asiatic-Pacific Theater during World War II. As with many of her class, the ship was never named. Instead, she was referred to by her hull designation.

Construction
The ship was laid down on 7 November 1942, under Maritime Commission (MARCOM) contract, MC hull 994, by  Kaiser Shipyards, Vancouver, Washington; launched 12 December 1942; and commissioned on 19 March 1943.

Service history  
During the war, LST-474 was assigned to the Pacific Theater of Operations. She took part in the Eastern New Guinea operations, the Lae occupation in September 1943, and the Saidor occupation in January 1944; the Bismarck Archipelago operations, the Green Island landing in February 1944; Hollandia operation in April 1944; the Western New Guinea operations, the Biak Islands operation in May and June 1944, and the Morotai landing in September 1944; the Leyte operation in October and November 1944; the Lingayen Gulf landings in January 1945; the consolidation and capture of the Southern Philippines, the Mindanao Island landings in April 1945; and the Borneo operation, the Balikpapan operation in June and July 1945.

Following the war, LST-474 performed occupation duty in the Far East in September 1945. She returned to the United States and was decommissioned on 22 March 1946, and struck from the Navy list on 17 April, that same year. On 17 December 1947, the ship was sold to the Ships and Power Equipment Corp., of Barber, New Jersey, and subsequently scrapped.

Honors and awards
LST-474 earned eight battle stars for her World War II service.

Notes 

Citations

Bibliography 

Online resources

External links

 

LST-1-class tank landing ships of the United States Navy
1942 ships
World War II amphibious warfare vessels of the United States
S3-M2-K2 ships
Ships built in Vancouver, Washington